The Hartwick-Ladora-Victor Community School District – often abbreviated H-L-V, or HLV –  is a rural public school district headquartered in Victor, Iowa.

The district spans areas of eastern Poweshiek and western Iowa counties, encompassing the communities of Hartwick, Ladora and Victor.

The main school campus is located in Victor. The school building has separate elementary and a junior high wings, and its administrative offices are also located there. The district is governed by a five-member board of directors, which meets monthly.

The school district is accredited by the North Central Association of Colleges and Schools and the Iowa Department of Education.

The H-L-V School District was formed in 1958, the result of the merger of three former school districts: Hartwick, Ladora and Victor. Athletic teams are known as the Warriors.

Athletics 
The Warriors compete in the South Iowa Cedar League Conference in the following sports:

Cross Country 
Volleyball
Football 
Basketball 
Wrestling
Track and Field 
Golf
Baseball
Softball

See also
List of school districts in Iowa
List of high schools in Iowa

References

External links
 HLV Community School District official site

School districts in Iowa
Education in Iowa County, Iowa
Education in Poweshiek County, Iowa
School districts established in 1958
1958 establishments in Iowa